Legendary Masters Series is the fourth album posthumously released in the US after Eddie Cochran's death in 1960.

Content
The album was released as a two album set on the United Artists label in January 1972. The catalogue number was UAS 9959.

Track listing

Notes

External links

Eddie Cochran albums
1972 compilation albums
United Artists Records compilation albums